Johnson Barnes III (born April 15, 1983), better known by his stage name Blu, is an American rapper and record producer from Los Angeles, California. He is best known for his group Blu & Exile and their debut album Below the Heavens (2007). He is a forefront member of the California-based collective, Dirty Science. Blu is also co-CEO of New World Color, a label through which he has released many of his projects. He is recognized for his collaboration albums between him and various producers such as Exile, Mainframe, Ta'Raach, Bombay, Damu the Fudgemunk, Madlib, Nottz, and Union Analogtronics.

Musical career

By age 19, Blu was selling out local shows at the Knitting Factory, House Of Blues, and headlining once a month at the Rumba Room on Universal City Walk. Back then, he recorded with various rap groups such as the Ill Flava Crew, Infinite Legacy crew, The Untouchable Mob, Glory For The People, The LA Metro Crew and the Bridgetown Steel Crew. He was also a contestant on the MTV game show, “Who Knows The Band” and won. Grammy award-winning producer Megahertz had flown Blu out to New York to sign him to his new label after producing hits for Jay-Z, R Kelly, P Diddy, Busta Rhymes, and Nas but eventually walked away from the deal. At age 20, he had started negotiating a record deal with Death Row Records but decided to independently release his first solo album titled “California Soul”. It was produced by early collaborators, L’s and Bombay. It featured Bridgetown crew members; Donel Smokes (Black Spade) and Miguel as well as then RRAG Records label mate, RBX.

2005–2008: Below the Heavens, C.R.A.C. and Johnson&Jonson 

After doing a feature for the group Science Project, Blu was introduced to Aloe Blacc, who was also featured on the album. Aloe Blacc said he had heard a lot about Blu and said he should work with the DJ/producer of his group Emanon, Exile. Exile came out to a Blu show, and afterwards invited him to be on his new compilation album entitled "Dirty Science" on Sound In Color Records. After hearing Blu on various compositions throughout Exile’s album, "Sound In Color" signed Blu to a one-album deal and immediately began to feature him on various releases for the label. After working with Oh No, and reaching out to J Dilla and Madlib for production on his own album, Blu decided to have Exile produce his entire LP for Sound In Color. By the time the album was done, Blu had completed two other full-length albums, one with Detroit hip-hop rapper/producer Ta’Raach and with Sound In Color/Operation Unknown producer and CEO, Mainframe.

In 2006, Blu pressed up the Lifted EP and mixtape premiering various productions with Exile and songs with J Dilla and KRS-One. While an opening act on a tour with Seattle-based LifeSavas and Dallas-based Strange Fruit Project, Blu discovered all three of his unreleased but fully completed full-length albums had leaked. The leak grew and crowds already knew his songs as he debuted them at each show for the rest of the tour. These three albums began to build a huge buzz online and caught the attention of Okayplayer, as well as other sites like HipHopDX and Nah Right, who all named him “Rookie Of The Year”.  The Exile-produced album was eventually released in 2007, entitled Below the Heavens. However, since the label Sound in Color were almost bankrupt, only 7,000 copies of the album was pressed on CD, with no vinyl other than the single for the album, “The Narrow Path”, which was also released in 2006. The label went bankrupt a few months later following the release.

In 2008, Blu & Ta’Raach released the album titled The Piece Talks under the moniker C.R.A.C. (or C.R.A.C. Knuckles). It was completely produced by Ta’Raach and featured Shawn Jackson, Noni Lomar, and Jazmin Mitchell. Originally sold on tour in 2005, the album included their hit single, “League Leaders” (The Friar cover) and the 6 inch single, “The King”.

During that same year, Blu’s album with Mainframe was released under the group name Johnson&Jonson. It was produced by Mainframe with rapping by Blu (alongside some occasional rapping from Mainframe), as well as features from Gonja Sufi and Miguel. It was promoted with a mixtape called Powders & Oils, which consisted of a few more exclusive songs. All of Johnson&Jonson's music consisted of only loops and raps.

2008–2011: Production moniker GODlee Barnes and Her Favorite Colo(u)r 

Blu used the production techniques he learned from working on albums with Exile, Mainframe, and Ta’Raach and began to produce beats. He started working on a what was intended to be a self-produced follow up to Below the Heavens. However, Blu's hard drive crashed, and the master files were lost; the album was eventually released in an unmixed and unmastered form, as a continuous mp3 file, in January 2010 under the title theGODleeBarnesLP. Blu also showcased his production on a albums including the collaboration with Brooklyn rapper and actor Sene entitled A Day Late & A Dollar Short and the instrumental album Open, which was later turned into a rap compilation of the same name, with various artists who rapped over the instrumental version of this album. Furthermore, Blu produced an album titled Her Favorite Colo(u)r for himself, which was initially released for free download online after breaking up with his girlfriend. The album was officially released in 2011.

2009–2012: Sire/Warner Bros, York, Jesus, and Give Me My Flowers While I Can Still Smell Them 
In 2009, Blu signed an artist deal, an independent film deal, as well as a label deal for his company, New World Color, with Tom Whalley at Warner Bros. Records. He then began working on a movie and album called No York. The album would feature production from Los Angeles beat scene heavyweights such as Flying Lotus, SA-RA Creative Partners, Daedelus, Madlib, Knxwledge, Samiyam, and others. The film was to be written by Blu and directed by Khalil Joseph. Eventually, labelmates began to leave the label and all the A&R representatives began to lose their jobs. Then Tom Whalley was fired and the entire label was bought out. This took place over a year and a half and brought complete stagnation to any Warner Bros. releases. Def Jam presidents and A&R’s were hired by Lyor Cohen, and Kyambo Joshua became Blu’s A&R representative and creative director. After so much stagnation and no one being paid for contributions, Kyambo eventually helped Blu leave the label and release his music independently. However, promo copies of No York were pressed.

Blu then released a mixtape in celebration of his independence titled Jesus, which was released under his imprint New World Color, in conjunction with Nature Sounds Records. This album was recorded in two days, produced by Blu, and featuring production from Madlib, Alchemist, Knxwledge, Hezekiah and Rome, as well as guest appearances from Planet Asia & Killer Ben of Durag Dynasty.

During Blu’s stay with Sire/Warner Bros, he was given 50 beats from Exile. Blu didn’t feel the production would fit his No York album, but found a bunch of old songs he wrote that had no beats. Blu recorded about 25 songs in two weeks to the Exile beats, which were later leaked online and eventually officially released under Dirty Science/Fat Beats, as Blu & Exile’s Give Me My Flowers While I Can Still Smell Them. The album featured guest appearances from Fashawn, Dag Savage, and Homeboy Sandman. An instrumental version of the album was also released.

The demo songs for “No York” were released as an album titled York through New World Color. Recorded in New York and Los Angeles; and initially leaked in 2011, the album featured exclusive and previously released production from Flying Lotus, SA-RA Creative Partners, Daedelus, Madlib, Knxwledge, Dibia$e, Samiyam, and Exile. It also featured vocals from U-God, Edan, Theophilus London, SA-RA, J*Davey, Andy Also, Pac Div, UNI, Tiron, and Ayomari. York was toured along the West Coast with the live band, Koochie Monsters replaying all the songs from the album. A group with Ken Beats, co-producer of York, also spawned off under a group called Neu Ngz. They performed live but never released any material.

2013–2016: Good To Be Home, Bad Neighbor and various projects with producers 
In 2014, Blu released a double album titled Good to Be Home produced entirely by one of his earliest producers, Bombay. Released on Nature Sound Records, the album was inspired by Blu connecting back with his West Coast roots after touring the world; and features guest appearances from Prodigy, Planet Asia, Strong Arm Steady, Step Brothers, Chace Infinite, Imani, LMNO & 2Mex from the Visionaries, MED, Oh No, Fashawn, Pac Div, Co$$, Definite Mass and many others.

Blu followed up with a collaboration album with MED, produced entirely by Madlib called Bad Neighbor with features from Stones Throw alumni MF Doom, Aloe Blacc, Dam Funk, Anderson .Paak, Mayor Hawthorne, Frank Nitt and Oh No, as well as Hodgy Beats (Odd Future), AMG, and Phonte. The album was promoted by a video and single for “Burgundy Whip” with Jimetta Rose back in 2013, and followed up with the single, “The Buzz” b/w “Peroxide” featuring Dâm-Funk. The album was also released as instrumentals.

In 2013, Blu teamed up with infamous Virginia producer Nottz for the EP Gods In The Spirit which featured Homeboy Sandman, Aloe Blacc, Dag Savage, and many others. The EP was followed up in 2016 with another EP, Titans in the Flesh which featured Skyzoo, Torae, Bishop Lamont and many others. Both EP’s were released under Coalmine Records, with the 2018 re-release Gods in the Spirit, Titans in the Flesh compiling both EPs into a full-length album. Other projects from 2016 included Crenshaw Jezebel with Ray West, Cheetah in the City with French production duo Union Analogtronics; and Open Your Optics to Optimism with Fa†e. Blu also released 45’s with Alchemist and The 45 King.

In 2017, Blu & Exile celebrated the 10th Anniversary of Below the Heavens at Regent Theater in Los Angeles, California, with a performance in its entirety with a live band.

2018-present: The Blueprint, A Long Red Hot Los Angeles Summer Night, For Sale and The Color Blu(e) 
In March 2018, Blu released a mixtape exclusively on his Bandcamp titled The DS Dumbstyle Mixtape, Volume One; which served as a compilation of songs Blu produced for various artists including Homeboy Sandman, Sene, Roc C, ScienZe, Young RJ and MED. This was then followed up a month later by the album The Blueprint, which was entirely produced by Shafiq Husayn. In 2019, Blu teamed up with rapper/producer Oh No to release A Long Red Hot Los Angeles Summer Night, which served as a concept album based on underground life in Los Angeles.

2021 saw Blu not only release the Sirplus-produced EP For Sale, but also his first multi-produced project since 2013's York: The Color Blu(e); which was released on September 24, 2021. Preceded by the singles "People Call Me Blu(e)" and "Because the Sky is Blu(e)" and featuring production from Exile, Sirplus and J57, the project serves as a concept album that celebrates and reflects on Blu's creative journey, with the word "Blu(e)" being featured in every of the album's song titles.

Discography

Studio albums
Below the Heavens  (2007) 
The Piece Talks  (2008)
Johnson&Jonson  (2008)
theGodleeBarnesLP  (2010)
Her Favorite Colo(u)r (2011)
Jesus (2011)
Give Me My Flowers While I Can Still Smell Them  (2012)
York (2013)
Good to Be Home  (2014)
Bad Neighbor  (2015)
Cheetah In The City  (2016)Gods In The Spirit, Titans In The Flesh  (2018)The Blueprint  (2018) A Long Red Hot Los Angeles Summer Night  (2019)True & Livin'  (2019)Ground & Water  (2019)Miles  (2020)The Color Blu(e) (2021)

Compilation albums

Mixtapes

EPs

Singles
 "The Narrow Path" (2006)
 "Lemonade" (2011)
 "Cellnl's" (2011)
 "Amnesia" (2011)
 "The Buzz" b/w "Peroxide" (2013) 
 "The Clean Hand" (2013)
 "The West" (2014)
 "The Return" b/w "Thriller" (2015)
 "Kiss the Sky" (2015)

Guest appearances
 Alchemist – "Therapy" from Chemical Warfare (2009)
 Fashawn – "Samsonite Man" from Boy Meets World (2009)
 The Grouch & Eligh – "Old Souls" from Say G&E! (2009)
 The Roots – "Radio Daze" and "The Day" from How I Got Over (2010)
 Exile – "When Nothing's Left" from 4TRK Mind (2011)
 MHz Legacy – "Yellow & Blue" from MHz Legacy (2012)
 Oh No – "Jones's" from Disrupted Ads (2013)
 Roc Marciano – "Cut the Check" from Marci Beaucoup (2013)
 Slum Village – "Let It Go" from Evolution (2013)
 Black Milk – "Leave the Bones Behind" from If There's a Hell Below (2014)
 Homeboy Sandman – "Loads" from Hallways (2014)
 Skyzoo & Torae – "Rediscover" from Barrel Brothers (2014)
 Step Brothers – "Tomorrow" from Lord Steppington (2014)
 Elliterate – "Games" from Charlie Russell (2017)
 The Funk Junkie – "As Live As It Gets (Games Redux)" from Moondirt (2017)
 Nolan The Ninja – "Lei$ure" from YEN (2017)
 Tope ft. Abstract Rude – Faithful (2018)
Vic Deal ft. Catt – "Changing" from La Costa Nostra'' (2020)

References

External links

 

African-American male rappers
People from San Pedro, Los Angeles
Rappers from Los Angeles
Sire Records artists
Underground rappers
1983 births
Five percenters
Living people
21st-century American rappers
21st-century American male musicians
21st-century African-American musicians
20th-century African-American people